Face to Face with Communism (1951) is an American Cold War propaganda film. It dramatized the effects on a small town of an imagined invasion of the United States by the Soviet Union. Its running time was 26 minutes.

See also
Battle Beneath the Earth (1967)
Invasion, U.S.A. (1952 film)
Invasion literature
Mosinee, Wis., mock Communist takeover (1950)
 Not This August (1955)
 Red Nightmare (1962)
Rocket Attack U.S.A. (1958)

References

External links

National Archives Catalog
 

Cold War films
1951 films
American anti-communist propaganda films
American black-and-white films
1950s American films